Foresta Fălticeni (also known as Foresta Suceava) was a Romanian professional football club from Fălticeni, Suceava County, Romania, founded in 1954 as Avântul Fălticeni and subsequently dissolved in 2003.

History

The club was founded in 1954 in Fălticeni under the name of Avântul Fălticeni.

Foresta was the first team representing Divizia C that played in a Romanian Cup final which was lost with 0–6 against Steaua București at the end of the 1966–67 season.

In 1997, the club was moved to Suceava after it won the promotion to the Divizia A for the first time in history. The main reason for the move was the inadequate state of Foresta's stadium in Fălticeni, which was both small and had a cracked stand. Another reason for the move was, that the main team in the city, CSM Suceava had failed to achieve any notable performances during the previous decade.

During the 3 seasons it spent in the Divizia A, a notable match was played against Dinamo București in which Dinamo was leading with 4–0 in the 70th minute, only to see Foresta turn the tables on them and win 5–4 in the end. The man of those 20 minutes was Robert Niţă who scored 2 goals.

Before it was dissolved in 2003 it moved back to Fălticeni to play the last matches in its history there.

Chronology of names

Notable managers
 Ionel Iuga
 Nicolae Babeti
 Vasile Florea
 Nicolae Constantin
 Cristian Antoniu
 Cornel Anton
 Ion Buzoianu
 Constantin Jamaischi
 Marin Barbu

Honours

Liga I:
Winners (0):, Best finnish: 13th 2000–01

Liga II:
Winners (2): 1996–97, 1999–00
Runners-up (1): 1995–96

Liga III:
Winners (5): 1956, 1973–74, 1982–83, 1988–89, 1994–95
Runners-up (3): 1968–69, 1979–80, 1980–81

Romanian Cup:
Winners (0):
Runners-up (1): 1966–67

References

Association football clubs established in 1954
Association football clubs disestablished in 2003
Defunct football clubs in Romania
Football clubs in Suceava County
Liga I clubs
Liga II clubs
1954 establishments in Romania
2003 disestablishments in Romania